Bermondsey Square is on Tower Bridge Road in Bermondsey, south London, England. It was the site of the 11th-century Bermondsey Abbey. The earliest medieval remains found are a Norman church from around 1080, which was recorded in the Domesday Book of 1086. The area has subsequently undergone redevelopment and Bermondsey Square now contains apartments, offices, a boutique hotel, restaurants, an independent cinema and Bermondsey Market.

Long Lane, leading northwest to Borough High Street, linked the Abbey with St George the Martyr church. To the west and heading north from the square is Bermondsey Street, leading to Tooley Street and London Bridge station.

History 

Bermondsey Square was formerly called the Court Yard and was originally the main quadrangle of Bermondsey Abbey. There was once a Chapel erected in 1699 by a Puritan divine. The chapel was subsequently a wool warehouse before it was demolished. At the entrance of the square, between the King John's Head public house and an oil shop, was the Abbey's gatehouse, which was removed in the early 19th century. Between the entrance to the Long Walk and a salt warehouse stood the Mansion House, built using material taken from the Abbey.

References

External links
 Bermondsey Square, London SE1 official website
 London SE1 community website information
 LondonTown.com information
 Bermondsey Square art, Flickr

Squares in the London Borough of Southwark
Square